The men's 110 metres hurdles at the 2014 European Athletics Championships took place at the Letzigrund on 13 and 14 August.

Medalists

Records

Schedule

Results

Round 1

First 3 in each heat (Q) and 4 best performers (q) advance to the Semifinals.

Semifinals

First 3 in each heat (Q) and 2 best performers (q) advance to the final.

Final

References

Heats Results
Semifinals Results
Final Results

Hurdles 110 M
Sprint hurdles at the European Athletics Championships